Sarah Addington (1891–1940) was an author of children's books and a newspaper journalist.

Early life
Addington was born in 1891.  She received a Bachelor of Arts degree from Earlham College in Richmond, Indiana in 1912.  She then studied at Columbia University. She married Howard Carl Reid in 1917.

Later life
During her later life, she made her home in New York City.  She died there on November 7, 1940.

Selected works

The Boy Who Lived in Pudding Lane: Being a True Account, If Only You Believe It, of the Life and Ways of Santa, Oldest Son of Mr. & Mrs. Claus. Boston: Atlantic Monthly Press, 1922.
Pied Piper of Pudding Lane. Illustrated by Gertrude A. Kay. Boston: Atlantic Monthly Press, 1923. 
Round the Year in Pudding Lane. Illustrated by Gertrude Alice Kay. Boston: Little, Brown, and Company, 1924. 
Pudding Lane People. Illustrated by Janet Laura Scott. Boston: Little Brown & Company, 1926. 
Jerry Juddkins. 1926.
Tommy Tingle Tangle.  Illustrated by Gertrude Alice Kay.  Joliet: P. F. Volland Company, 1927.
Grammar Town. Illustrated by Gertrude Alice Kay. Philadelphia: David McKay Co., 1927. 
Dance Team. New York: D. Appleton, 1931.  
Hound of Heaven. New York: D. Appleton-Century Co., 1935.

References

Wallace, W. Stewart. A Dictionary of North American Authors Deceased Before 1950. Detroit: Gale Research Co, 1968.

External links
 Sarah Addington papers, 1921–1937 at Columbia University, Rare Book & Manuscript Library (finding aid)
 

1891 births
1940 deaths
20th-century American non-fiction writers
American children's writers
20th-century American journalists
American women journalists
20th-century American women writers